Kuwait Chamber of Commerce and Industry (KCCI) is a non-government institution representing business establishments in Kuwait. The Chamber acts on the behalf of, represents and lobbies for the interests of businesspersons and industrialists in Kuwait.

History
The establishment of a Chamber of Commerce was first mooted in 1952. Three years later in 1955 the Chamber was established and in 1959, the election of the Chamber’s first Board of Directors took place.

KCCI is a truly democratic organisation. The members of the Board of Directors are all elected and its leading figures are known for their contribution to industry and business. The KCCI growth kept in line with the country’s growth.

About KCCI
KCCI is a non-profit, self-financed private institution. Currently the registered members exceeds 79000 and represents the general assembly. The general assembly elects 24 members for the Board of Directors for a period of 4 years, half of whom are elected every two years.
Subscriptions and authentication fees  are the main resources of income. The President and the Board Members are considered volunteers for public services. The Chamber is a consultative entity in all economic affairs.

Branches
There are nine branches
 Main Branch, Kuwait City
 Ministries Complex, Kuwait City
 Liberation Tower, Kuwait City
 Khaitan
 Jleeb Al Shuyoukh
 Jaber Al Ali
 Jahara
 Al Sadeeq
 Eshbelia

See also

 Qatar Chamber of Commerce and Industry
 Islamabad Chamber of Commerce & Industry
 London Chamber of Commerce & Industry
 List of company registers

References

External links
 Official website

Economy of Kuwait
Chambers of commerce
1955 establishments in Kuwait